Coleophora euryaula is a moth of the family Coleophoridae. It is found in Egypt.

The larvae feed on the leaves and fruits of Lycium europaeum and possibly Astragalus forskahlei.

References

euryaula
Endemic fauna of Egypt
Moths of Africa
Moths described in 1925